Svätopluk is a Slovak opera by Eugen Suchoň with the subtitle Musical drama in three acts. The libretto is by Eugen Suchoň, Ivan Stodola and Jela Krčméry-Vrteľová and is loosely based on Stodola's play Kráľ Svätopluk, which was in turn based on events in the life of King Svatopluk I. Suchoň composed Svätopluk between 1952 and 1959. It was premiered on 10 March 1960 in the Slovak National Theatre, directed by Miloš Wasserbauer and conducted by Tibor Frešo.

Synopsis
 
The story of this opera takes place around year 894 in Great Moravia. The king Svatopluk I feels that he is going to die and hands over his reign to his two sons. The fictive story is partially based on historical events and real persons.

Act 1
Igric Záboj loves princess Ľutomíra who schemes to make Pannonian prince Braslav the king of the Great Moravia. Záboj reveals secret messages about Svätopluk concentrating his army behind Danube and preparing to attack Franks. Ľutomíra sends this important message using a dove to Pannonia. King Svätopluk ceremonially inaugurates new rulers of the kingdom - his sons Mojmír and young Svätopluk. Mojmír is a supporter of Konštantín a Metod's teaching and wants to raise people from enthrallment, void the kingdom of the Frank priests and abandon slavery. Young Svätopluk is, however, ambitious and wants to seize the throne himself with the help of Franks. Slave girl Blagota asks for help for her daughter Milena, which was captured by pagans who want to make her a living sacrifice to their gods. Svätopluk gives this for consideration to his sons. Mojmír wants to free the girl immediately and break up the pagans contrary to young Svätopluk who pleads for pagans and sees them mainly as good warriors and his allies. A struggle arises in which both sons attack the king with remorses for the death of the uncle Rastislav after he tells them about his plans to attack Francia. A soldier brings in a message found in a shot dove—it was the message sent by Ľutomíra. The king is outraged, orders his army to gather and leads the assault against Franks himself.

Act 2
Pagan cemetery. In the tradition of the old rites, a young girl must die at the burial of a youth of majestic descent, who deceased as a hero in fight, to become his after-life bride. Young Svätopluk arrives. Pagan prophets foretell him god Perún's will: kill the king, your father, and you will reign yourself. Young Svätopluk agrees and runs away. Suddenly a regiment of Mojmír's army arrives, breaks up pagans, destroys their idols and frees young Milena who gratefully offers herself into Mojmír's service. Soldiers appeal Mojmír to capture his father's castle and seize his throne, but Mojmír refuses to act against his father in any way, but he wants to meet with him and negotiate about further ruling over Great Moravia. Ľutomíra hearing everything decides to destroy Mojmír by a plot and desires to become the ruler of Great Moravia herself.

Act 3
Svätopluk's adviser Dragomír finds out about Mojmír's deeds and orders his imprisonment. Mojmír admits killing pagans, but refuses accusation of killing father. Then Ľutomíra comes in and trickily testifies that the letter which she wrote and which was captured by royal guard was written by Mojmír. This frustrates the king and he orders to imprison Mojmír. Milena who became his faithful companion falls down at kings' feet and appeals for Mojmír that she heard that not Mojmír, but his second son seeks to kill him. Nobody believes the girl, but in spite of that Dragomír strengthens royal guards. At the full moon, young Svätopluk attempts to kill his father, but guards prevent him from doing this. The king can't believe his eyes. He suffers from a deep personal and emotional crisis – both sons are against him and tried to kill him. In his madness, he sees a revelation of blood-stained eyes which reminds him his old betrayal of his uncle Rastislav. He is found in aberrance by his third son Predslav, a monk, arriving to encourage him and beg for his brothers to lift their death sentence. The king says: "It's not needed." He feels that his life is ending, so he gathers people and his sons, forgives them and divides the reign. He takes rods and warns his sons against disunity. "Separately they bend easily, but join them together and nobody will break them." The king dies and struggle between sons begins. Young Svätopluk is not satisfied with his task and attacks with sword Mojmír who became heir of the crown. Mojmír is saved by Milena who protects him by her own body and dies almost at the same time as the king. Young Svätopluk flees saying: "Mojmír, we'll meet at the battlefield later!" and the fate of the Great Moravia is now unavoidable.

References
 This article is a translation of Svätopluk (opera) on the Slovak Wikipedia. The original article did not list any sources.

External links
Eugen Suchoň: Svätopluk, Slovak National Theatre

Operas
1960 operas
Slovak-language operas
Operas by Eugen Suchoň